Niphostola is a genus of moths of the family Crambidae.

Species
Niphostola micans Hampson, 1896
Niphostola punctata Swinhoe, 1904

References

Natural History Museum Lepidoptera genus database

Pyraustinae
Crambidae genera
Taxa named by George Hampson